The Shire of Aramac was a local government area located in central Queensland about  north west of the state capital, Brisbane, between the towns of Barcaldine and Winton.

History 

The Aramac Division was created on 11 November 1879 as one of 74 divisions around Queensland under the Divisional Boards Act 1879 with a population of 841.

On 9 May 1900, part of the Aramac Division was excised to create the new Longreach Division under the Divisional Boards Act 1887.

On 27 December 1902, part of the Aramac Division was excised to create the Ilfracombe Division under the Divisional Boards Act 1887.

With the passage of the Local Authorities Act 1902, Aramac Division became the Shire of Aramac on 31 March 1903.

On 15 March 2008, under the Local Government (Reform Implementation) Act 2007 passed by the Parliament of Queensland on 10 August 2007, the Shire of Aramac merged with the Shires of Barcaldine and Jericho to form the Barcaldine Region.

The Shire operated the Aramac Tramway from Aramac to its junction near Barcaldine with the Central Western railway line from Rockhampton to Longreach from 1911 to 1975.

Towns and localities 
The Shire of Aramac included the following settlements:

 Aramac (town)
Bangall
Cornish Creek
Galilee
Ibis
Ingberry
 Muttaburra (town)
Pelican Creek
Sardine
Tablederry
Upland
Upper Cornish Creek

Chairmen

 1880: T. Whannell 
 1881: J. Tilbury (resigned November 1881)
 1882: E.R. Edkins (resigned March 1882)
 1882: W. Forsyth 
 1883–1884: T. Whannell 
 1885: W. Forsyth 
 1886–1888: E.R. Edkins 
 1889–1890: S.P. Fraser 
 1891: E.R. Edkins 
 1892–1901: S.P. Fraser 
 1902: E.R. Edkins 
 1903–1905: S.P. Fraser 
 1906: D.C.K. Cameron 
 1907–1914: S.P. Fraser 
 1915 – December 1923: E.W. Bowyer 
 1924–1936: Sydney Harold Fraser 
 1936–1939: B. Duke 
 1939–1946: Sydney Harold Fraser 
 1946–1955: R.A. Stobo 
 1955–1976: J.T. Neill 
 1976–1982: O.N. Landers 
 1986: Antonio Monte de Ramos Jr

Population

See also
 List of tramways in Queensland

References

External links

 

Former local government areas of Queensland
1879 establishments in Australia
2008 disestablishments in Australia
Populated places disestablished in 2008